Raimundus Johannes Hendrikus van der Gouw (born 24 March 1963) is a Dutch former professional footballer, who played as a goalkeeper.

After a successful career with Vitesse in his native Netherlands, and well into his 30s, he moved to Manchester United, also experiencing relative recognition despite playing sparingly and being used mostly as a backup; he made 61 appearances in six seasons for the Red Devils, of which 37 were in the Premier League. He scored his only goal in the last game of his career for AGOVV, before retiring at the age of 44, and becoming a coach.

Football career

Netherlands 
Van der Gouw's first club was Go Ahead Eagles. A product of the club's youth system, he made his debut for the first team in a 2–1 victory against Den Bosch, on 14 September 1985. At the time, Eagles were competing in the bottom half of the first division, achieving a tenth-placed finish in the player's first season. However, the club experienced relegation in 1987, and failed to achieve promotion the following season. After 97 league appearances, Van der Gouw joined second level's Vitesse.

His first season for Vitesse saw the club win the Eerste Divisie title, promoting to the top flight of Dutch football for the first time in nine seasons. The following season saw further progress; a fourth-place finish in 1989–90 saw Vitesse qualify for the UEFA Cup for the first time in its history. The club also reached the final of the domestic cup.

In European competition, as Vitesse reached the UEFA Cup quarter-finals, Van der Gouw kept four consecutive clean sheets, before the side eventually lost to Sporting CP. Vitesse consistently finished in the top six in subsequent seasons, but were less impressive in Europe, suffering a 3–0 aggregate defeat to Norwich City, among other results.

England 
Having played more than 350 league games in the Netherlands, Van der Gouw was an experienced choice for taking Tony Coton's place when the latter departed to Sunderland, and was transferred to Manchester United for a fee of £500,000.

Van der Gouw's experience played a part in United's successes, both as a player and as goalkeeping coach at the club. His United debut came against Aston Villa on 21 September 1996, when he kept a clean sheet. A notable appearance came against Borussia Dortmund in the semi-final of the 1996–97 UEFA Champions League, when Peter Schmeichel pulled out with injury just minutes before kick-off. United lost the match 1–0, but Van der Gouw helped keep the score down.

In 1998, Van der Gouw again played in a crucial Champions League match for United, the second leg of the quarter-final against AS Monaco. In a spirited performance, he denied several clear chances for the opposition, and the 34-year-old Dutchman would have kept a clean sheet were it not for a powerful long range goal early on from David Trezeguet. The Red Devils drew 1–1 but were knocked out on away goals. Ever the teacher, Van der Gouw coached United's young goalkeepers for a while, but relinquished this role in 1998–99 when Coton rejoined the club, in the same capacity, although not with a playing contract.

In 1999–2000, for the first time in his United career, Van der Gouw played enough games to claim a Premier League medal; he made 23 appearances in all competitions during that season, of which 14 were in the Premier League. He started in 11 Premier League matches, and in 3 others he replaced the faltering Mark Bosnich as a substitute. This run of relatively regular play included United's defeat in the 1999 UEFA Super Cup, and he also featured in some of United's Champions League matches, including a notable performance against group rivals Sturm Graz – in which he made a string of saves, kept a clean sheet and stopped a penalty from Ivica Vastić. He also made his only appearance in a FIFA-organised tournament, against South Melbourne in the 2000 Club World Championship.

Following the arrival of Fabien Barthez, Van der Gouw resumed his role as a backup goalkeeper in 2000–01, being sent off for the only time in English competition, against Watford in the League Cup, on 31 October 2000. Despite having made only 26 starts in five seasons, and the arrival of Roy Carroll, he signed a one-year extension to his contract in the summer of 2001. Van der Gouw made his last appearance for the club on 11 May 2002, against Charlton Athletic in a goalless draw at Old Trafford on the final day of the season, and in the process became the oldest United player since the end of the Second World War, two months after his 39th birthday. He was the oldest player contracted to United throughout his six years at the club. However, this was one of only two substitute appearances in 2001–02, resulting in a free transfer to West Ham United in June 2002. He played 61 competitive games in six years for the Red Devils.

Having turned down a move to Coventry City, Van der Gouw signed a one-year deal with West Ham, with the option of a second. He did not play a competitive game for the club, and was released after one season following the club's relegation.

Later career 
 After leaving West Ham, Van der Gouw then returned to the Netherlands, where he joined RKC Waalwijk for the 2003–04 season, but only made one league appearance. He subsequently joined AGOVV, where a strong finish to 2005–06 enabled the team to reach the playoffs for topflight promotion. Whilst at the club, he played 100 league matches and scored the only league goal of his career, a penalty in his last professional game. He retired from playing at the age of 44.

In June 2007, Van der Gouw returned to England as goalkeeping coach at Sunderland, linking up with former Manchester United teammate Roy Keane. He was brought in to work in conjunction with Tim Carter, who served in that capacity prior to Van der Gouw's arrival, and Carter eventually returned to coaching the team's academy players following the appointment.

After Ricky Sbragia resigned at the end of the 2008–09 season and Steve Bruce was subsequently appointed as the new manager, Van der Gouw left Sunderland to return to his old club Vitesse, also as goalkeeping coach.

Personal life 
His son Ennio van der Gouw is a goalkeeper in the Netherlands at VVV-Venlo.

Career statistics

Honours
Vitesse
Eerste Divisie: 1988–89

Manchester United
Premier League: 1999–2000, 2000–01
FA Cup: 1998–99
FA Charity Shield: 1996, 1997
UEFA Champions League: 1998–99

References

External links 

1963 births
Living people
People from Oldenzaal
Dutch footballers
Association football goalkeepers
Eredivisie players
Eerste Divisie players
Go Ahead Eagles players
SBV Vitesse players
RKC Waalwijk players
AGOVV Apeldoorn players
Premier League players
Manchester United F.C. players
West Ham United F.C. players
Dutch expatriate footballers
Expatriate footballers in England
Sunderland A.F.C. non-playing staff
UEFA Champions League winning players
Footballers from Overijssel
SBV Vitesse non-playing staff
PSV Eindhoven non-playing staff
Association football goalkeeping coaches
Dutch expatriate sportspeople in England